The 2022 North Yorkshire Council election took place on 5 May 2022, alongside the other local elections. These will be the last elections to North Yorkshire County Council, and the elected councillors will also serve as the first councillors on the North Yorkshire Council (a new unitary authority), which will replace the existing county council in April 2023.

The scheduled 2021 North Yorkshire County Council elections were not held due to the restructure of local government in the county.

The North Yorkshire County Council is currently led by a Conservative Party majority.

Previous council composition 

Changes:
 August 2018: David Goode gains seat for Liberal Democrats from Conservatives in by-election
 July 2019: John Blackie (independent) dies; by-election held October 2019
 October 2019: Yvonne Peacock gains seat for Conservatives from independent in by-election
 October 2019: Andrew Jenkinson leaves Conservatives to sit as an independent
 November 2019: Andrew Backhouse leaves Conservatives to sit as an independent
 January 2021: Richard Welch (Conservative) dies; by-election held in May 2021
 March 2021: Geoff Weber (Liberal Democrats) dies; by-election held in May 2021
 May 2021: Matt Scott gains seat for Conservatives from Liberal Democrats in by-election, David Staveley retains seat for Conservatives in by-election
 February 2022: Caroline Goodrick leaves Conservatives to sit as an independent
 Val Arnold leaves Conservatives to sit as an independent
 David Hugill leaves Conservatives to sit as an independent

Results Summary

Candidates 
Statements of persons nominated were published on 6 April.

Craven area

Aire Valley

Bentham & Ingleton 

Changes are shown from 2017 with the identical North Craven division of North Yorkshire County Council.

Glusburn, Cross Hills & Sutton-in-Craven

Mid Craven

Settle & Penyghent

Skipton East & South

Skipton North & Embsay-with-Eastby

Skipton West & West Craven 

1 - Solloway and Madeley were both tied on 503 votes; Solloway won the seat via drawing of lots.

Hambleton area

Aiskew & Leeming

Bedale

Easingwold

Great Ayton

Hillside & Raskelf

Huby & Tollerton

Hutton Rudby & Osmotherley

Morton-on-Swale & Appleton Wiske

Northallerton North & Brompton

Northallerton South

Romanby

Sowerby & Topcliffe

Stokesley

Thirsk

Harrogate area

Bilton & Nidd Gorge

Bilton Grange & New Park

Boroughbridge & Claro

Coppice Valley & Duchy

Fairfax & Starbeck

Harlow & St. Georges

High Harrogate & Kingsley

Killinghall, Hampsthwaite & Saltergate

Knaresborough East

Knaresborough West

Masham & Fountains

Oatlands & Pannal

Ouseburn

Pateley Bridge & Nidderdale

Ripon Minster & Moorside

Ripon Ure Bank & Spa

Spofforth with Lower Wharfedale & Tockwith

Stray, Woodlands & Hookstone

Valley Gardens & Central Harrogate

Washburn & Birstwith

Wathvale & Bishop Monkton

Richmondshire area

Catterick Village & Brompton-on-Swale

Hipswell & Colburn

Leyburn & Middleham

North Richmondshire

Richmond

Scotton & Lower Wensleydale

Upper Dales

Ryedale area

Amotherby & Ampleforth

Helmsley & Sinnington

Kirkbymoorside & Dales

Malton

Norton

Pickering

Sheriff Hutton & Derwent

Thornton Dale & Wolds

Scarborough area

Castle

Cayton

Danby & Mulgrave

Derwent Valley & Moor

Eastfield

Esk Valley & Coast

Falsgrave & Stepney

Filey

Hunmanby & Sherburn

Newby

Northstead

Scalby & the Coast

Seamer

Weaponness & Ramshill

Wharfedale

Whitby Streonshalh

Whitby West

Woodlands

Selby area

Appleton Roebuck & Church Fenton

Barlby & Riccall

Brayton & Barlow

Camblesforth & Carlton 

Changes are shown from the 2021 by-election to the identical Camblesforth & Carlton ward of Selby District Council.

Cawood & Escrick

Cliffe & North Duffield

Monk Fryston & South Milford

Osgoldcross

Selby East

Selby West

Sherburn in Elmet

Tadcaster

Thorpe Willoughby & Hambleton

By-elections

Masham and Fountains

References

North Yorkshire
2020s in North Yorkshire
North Yorkshire County Council elections
North Yorkshire Council elections